Due to the COVID-19 pandemic in Canada, competitions were greatly altered, either starting late, or being curtailed. Due to border restrictions, many Canadian clubs that participate in soccer leagues with American soccer clubs did not participate, or were forced to play some of their regular season matches in the United States.

National teams 

When available, the home team or the team that is designated as the home team is listed in the left column; the away team is in the right column.

Men's

Senior

2021 CONCACAF Gold Cup

Group B

Knockout stage

2022 FIFA World Cup qualification

CONCACAF First round

CONCACAF Second round

CONCACAF Third round

U–23

CONCACAF Men's Olympic Qualifying Championship

The draw for the tournament took place on January 9, 2020, 19:00 CST (UTC−6), at the Estadio Akron, in Guadalajara, Mexico. On March 13, 2020, CONCACAF suspended all upcoming Concacaf competitions scheduled to take place over the next 30 days.

On January 14, 2021, CONCACAF announced that the Men's Olympic Qualifying will take place between March 18 and 30.

Group B

Knockout stage

Women's

Senior 

On December 30, 2021, the women's national soccer team were named the Canadian Press Team of the Year Award.

Friendlies

SheBelieves Cup

Summer Olympics

Group E

Knockout stage

Men's domestic club leagues

Canadian Premier League 

Eight teams play in this league, all of which are based in Canada. It is considered a Division 1 men's league in the Canadian soccer league system.

Regular season

Playoffs

Final

League1 Ontario (Men) 

16 teams play in this league, all of which are based in Canada.  It is considered a Division 3 men's league in the Canadian soccer league system.

East Division

West Division

Playoffs

PLSQ 

10 teams play in this league, all of which are based in Canada.  It is considered a Division 3 men's league in the Canadian soccer league system.

Canadian Soccer League 
  

8 teams play in this league, all of which are based in Canada. It is a Non-FIFA league previously sanctioned by the Canadian Soccer Association and is now a member of the Soccer Federation of Canada (SFC).

Domestic cups

Canadian Championship

Bracket

Final

Men's international clubs leagues

Major League Soccer 

Three Canadian teams (CF Montréal, Toronto FC, and Vancouver Whitecaps FC) play in this league, which also contains 24 teams from the United States.  It is considered a Division 1 men's league in the United States soccer league system.

Overall standings

USL League One 

One Canadian team (Toronto FC II) plays in this league, which also contains 11 teams from the United States. It is considered a Division 3 men's league in the United States soccer league system.

Women's club leagues

National Women's Soccer League 

No Canadian teams play in this league, though players from the Canada women's national soccer team are allocated to its teams by the Canadian Soccer Association.  It is considered a Division 1 women's league in the United States soccer league system.

United Women's Soccer 

One Canadian team (Calgary Foothills WFC) plays in this league, which also contains 44 teams from the United States. It is considered a Division 2 women's league in the United States soccer league system.

West Conference

League1 Ontario (Women) 

14 teams play in this league, all of which are based in Canada.

Main Division

Playoffs

Summer Championship Division

Première Ligue de soccer du Québec (Women)

Standings

Playoffs

Men's international club competitions

CONCACAF competitions

CONCACAF Champions League

Teams in bold advanced in the competition.

Round of 16

|}

Quarter-finals

|}

CONCACAF League

Teams in bold advanced in the competition.

Preliminary round 

|}

Round of 16 

|}

Quarter-finals 

|}

Semi-finals 

|}

Leagues Cup

No Canadian teams qualified for the Leagues Cup.

Campeones Cup

No Canadian teams qualified for the Campeones Cup.

References

External links 
 Canadian Soccer Association

2021 in Canadian soccer
Seasons in Canadian soccer
2021 sport-related lists